Helmsdorf may refer to the following places in Germany:

Helmsdorf, Thuringia, in the Eichsfeld district, Thuringia
 , a locality in Heiligenthal, in Mansfeld-Südharz district, Sachsen-Anhalt
A locality in Stolpen, in the Sächsische Schweiz district, Saxony
A locality in Geisenhausen, in Landshut district, Bavaria